Sibanye-Stillwater is a multinational mining and metals processing Group with a diverse portfolio of mining and processing operations and projects and investments across five continents. The Group is also one of the foremost global PGM auto catalytic recyclers and has interests in leading mine tailings retreatment operations.

Sibanye-Stillwater has established itself as one of the world’s largest primary producers of platinum, palladium, and rhodium and is also a top-tier gold producer. It produces other PGMs, such as iridium and ruthenium, along with chrome, copper and nickel as by-products. 
The Group has recently begun to build and diversify its asset portfolio into battery metals mining and processing and is increasing its presence in the circular economy by growing and diversifying its recycling and tailings reprocessing operations globally.

History
In 2012, Gold Fields Limited unbundled its subsidiary, GFI Mining South Africa Proprietary Limited (“GFIMSA”), which was then renamed Sibanye Gold Limited (“Sibanye Gold”), and consisted of the KDC (formerly Kloof) and Beatrix mines, as well as an array of support service entities in South Africa. "Gold Fields stockholders were given one share in Sibanye for each of their Gold Fields shares." The three South African mines transferred from Gold Fields to Sibanye are:

 Beatrix gold mine
 KDC mine (formerly Kloof)
 Driefontein mine

The company immediately embarked upon a strategic growth plan which saw the 2013 acquisition of the Cooke operations from Gold One as well as the WitsGold acquisition (Burnstone project) of 2014.  

In April 2016 the company entered the PGM space, with an all-share offer for Aquarius Platinum. (comprising Kroondal, Platinum Mile, a 50% shareholding in Zimbabwe's Mimosa mine and a number of exploration projects), as well as the acquisition of the Rustenburg operations from Anglo American Platinum Limited.

On 30 August 2017, following the successful purchase of the Stillwater mine in Montana, Sibanye Gold Limited began trading as Sibanye-Stillwater and reorganized its operations by region –  Southern Africa and the United States.

In June 2019, Sibanye-Stillwater acquired Lonmin Plc, London, UK, a top tier PGM producer. The enlarged group is the world’s largest primary producer of platinum and rhodium, one of the largest producer of palladium and the leading recycler and processor of spent PGM catalytic converter materials.

February 2021 saw the Group enter the battery metals industry with an investment into and partnership with Keliber, a leading European Lithium project based in Finland. 

According to their 2020 annual report, the company produced 3 million ounces of PGM and 0.98 million ounces of gold.

In 2020, the group employed 84,775 people, mostly in South Africa. Thus, Sibanye-Stillwater is one of the top four private sector employers in South Africa and the largest industrial employer in the state of Montana.  

Sibanye-Stillwater’s primary listing is on the Johannesburg Stock Exchange (JSE) in South Africa.  The company trades under ticker codes JSE:SSW (previously SGL) and NYSE:SBSW  as of its relisting on February 19, 2020.

Controversies

Marikana miners' strike (Lonmin) 

In 2012, what started as a peaceful protest resulted in a massacre. The Marikana massacre was the killing of thirty-four miners by the South African Police Service (SAPS) on 16 August 2012, during a wildcat strike at the Lonmin platinum mine in Marikana, Rustenburg, North West province, South Africa. The violence started because of a history of antagonism and violence between the African National Congress-allied National Union of Mineworkers (NUM) and its emerging rival, the Association of Mineworkers and Construction Union (AMCU). At the Marikana platinum mine, operated by Lonmin at Nkaneng near Rustenburg, 3,000 workers walked off the job on 10 August after Lonmin failed to meet with workers. On 11 August, NUM leaders allegedly opened fire on striking NUM members who were marching to their offices. The killing of two miners was reported in the South African media as a central reason for the breakdown in trust within the union amongst workers. Despite earlier contradictory reports, the clashes on the 11th are now acknowledged to be the first incidents of violence during the strike.

According to the Bench Marks Foundation, the violence erupted against a backdrop of a lack of employment opportunities for local youth, squalid living conditions, unemployment and growing inequalities. It claimed the workers were exploited and this was a motivation for the violence. It also criticised the high profits when compared with the low wages of the workers.

2014 South African platinum strike (Lonmin) 

In 2014, a five-month-long platinum strike had resulted in the deaths of four people, six stabbings, and 24 billion rand ($2.25 billion) in lost revenue for the South African platinum industry. The GDP of South Africa contracted in the first quarter of 2014, pulled down by the steepest drop in mining production (25% of which 19% was directly attributable to the strike) in 50 years. It was the first contraction since 2009. Workers, most of whom already lived in poverty, lost around 11 billion rands ($1 billion) in wages.

2018 safety incident 
In January 2018, a power outage caused by poor weather resulted in nearly 1000 miners being trapped underground. This occurred at the Beatrix gold mine near Welkom, South Africa.  Some of the trapped miners were rescued the day of the incident, and the remaining 955 were rescued after around 30 hours when power was restored to one of the lifts. The incident resulted in pressure from labour unions, including the National Union of Metalworkers of South Africa, for mine management to address safety concerns before it can reopen.

2018 fatalities 
In early 2018, 20 out of the 45 mining deaths in South Africa occurred at Sibanye Stillwater. Then Minister of Mineral Resources, Gwede Mantashe, deplored the figure: “We are very worried about the fact that out of 45 fatalities thus far‚ 20 are from one company.” Another death was reported a few weeks later.

2019 strike 
In 2019, a violent five-month strike resulted in nine deaths, an estimated 62 houses burnt down, and several wounded, which including burned children. The strike started as a dispute over wages but became the center of inter-union violence. Sibanye-Stillwater spokesperson James Wellsted said more than 500 mineworkers, which belonged to NUM and AMCU, and their families had to be evacuated because the situation was so unsafe.

Carbon footprint
Sibanye Stillwater reported Total CO2e emissions (Direct + Indirect) for 31 December 2020 at 6,433 Kt (-652 /-9.2% y-o-y). There is little evidence of a consistent declining trend as yet.

References

External links 
 sibanyestillwater.com

Mining companies of South Africa
Gold mining companies of South Africa
Companies based in Johannesburg
Companies listed on the Johannesburg Stock Exchange